I WeirDO  is a 2020 Taiwanese romantic drama film written and directed by Liao Ming-yi (in his feature directorial debut), and starring Austin Lin, Nikki Hsieh. The film had its world premiere at the 22nd Far East Film Festival on June 29, 2020, where it won the Purple Mulberry Award. It was officially released in Taiwan on August 7, 2020. It is the first Asian feature to be filmed entirely on an iPhone, a 32-day shoot on the iPhone XS Max.

Synopsis
Po-Ching is a freelance translator with severe OCD and serious symptoms of mysophobia. He spends most of his waking hours cleaning up his apartment, covers up fully when going out, frequently washes his hands wherever he goes and limits his grocery shopping to the 15th of each month. As a result, his habits have isolated him from the general public and people see him as a complete weirdo.

On one such shopping trip, he meets another weirdo Chen Ching, who shares similar habits and tics. As they spend time together, Po-Ching learns that Chen Ching works as a nude model for drawing classes, but her allergies mean that she frequently experiences hive attacks during prolonged sessions. Po-Ching proposes that Chen Ching move in with him so they can support each other, and they quickly bond over their shared habits and experienced difficulties, becoming boyfriend and girlfriend. Together, they swear that nothing will change between them.

The following day, Po-Ching suddenly discovers that he is no longer mysophobic, being able to touch grime on a window without breaking out in allergies. A distraught Chen Ching consults various doctors to see if Po-Ching's OCD can be restored before he assures her that his newfound state will change nothing. Despite this, Chen Ching realizes that Po-Ching will eventually yearn for a normal life not bound by the limits of his previous lifestyle; sure enough, Po-Ching accepts a job at a publishing company, becomes distant from Chen Ching as his career progresses, and eventually dumps Chen Ching to move in with his colleague Mei-Yu. Chen Ching returns to her previous apartment as an emotional wreck, while Po-Ching discovers that he has started obsessively washing his hands again, as if from stress triggered by his betrayal.

The movie abruptly cuts back to Chen Ching lying awake in bed next to Po-Ching, revealing that the events of Po-Ching's recovery have been a dream. Spotting a stray lizard, Chen Ching gets out of bed and inadvertently grabs a dirty broom to chase it away, realizing that her own mysophobia has been cured overnight. Recounting the events of her dream, Chen Ching imagines a sequence of events where her and Po-Ching's roles are reversed: she goes ahead to lead a normal life, takes on an office job, and eventually leaves Po-Ching to pursue a relationship with her co-worker, leaving Po-Ching distraught and alone in his house.

Back in the present, Po-Ching wakes up to find Chen Ching clutching the dirty broom. She looks back at him, visibly shaking and tearful, knowing that their relationship has irreparably changed and terrified of the future to come, concluding the movie on a cliffhanger.

Cast
 Austin Lin as Chen Po Ching
 Nikki Hsieh as Chen Ching
 Chang Shao-huai as Psychatrist
 Aviis Zhong as Mei-Yu
 Chung	Cheng-chun as Chen Ching's Colleague
 Zhong	Yuechun as Dermatology Clinic Physician

Awards and nominations

References

External links
 

2020s Mandarin-language films
2020 romantic drama films
Taiwanese romantic drama films
Films about couples
Films about interpreting and translation
Films about obsessive–compulsive disorder
Films set in Taipei
Mobile phone films